is a  Japanese racing driver.

Racing Record

Complete Formula Nippon results 
(key) (Races in bold indicate pole position) (Races in italics indicate fastest lap)

References 

1980 births
Living people
Japanese racing drivers
Japanese Formula 3 Championship drivers
Formula Nippon drivers
Super GT drivers

Kondō Racing drivers
TOM'S drivers
24H Series drivers
Craft-Bamboo Racing drivers
Asian Le Mans Series drivers